The Bright Shawl is a 1923 American silent historical drama film directed by John S. Robertson and produced by and starring Richard Barthelmess. This film, based on a novel by Joseph Hergesheimer, had several days of filming on location in Cuba. It features the first confirmed film appearance of Edward G. Robinson (credited as E.G. Robinson).

Plot
In the nineteenth century, an American visiting Cuba with a friend becomes mixed up with the island's independence movement against Spanish rule.

Cast
Richard Barthelmess as Charles Abbott
Dorothy Gish as La Clavel
Jetta Goudal as La Pilar
William Powell as Gaspar De Vaca
Mary Astor as Narcissa Escobar
George Beranger as Andre Escobar (credited as Andre Beranger)
Edward G. Robinson as Domingo Escobar (credited as E.G. Robinson)
Margaret Seddon as Carmencita Escobar
Anders Randolf as Captain Cesar Y Santacilla
Luis Alberni as Vincente Escobar, Andre's brother
George Humbert as Jaime Quintara
Julian Rivero as a soldier (unbilled)

Preservation
A print of The Bright Shawl survives at the UCLA Film and Television Archive.

References

External links

The Bright Shawl at Virtual History
Still at silenthollywood.com

1923 films
Films directed by John S. Robertson
American black-and-white films
American silent feature films
American historical drama films
Films based on American novels
1920s historical drama films
Films set in the 19th century
Films set in Cuba
1923 drama films
1920s American films
Silent American drama films